Ani-ye Vosta (also Romanized as Ānī-ye Vosţá; also known as Anī-ye Vasaţ, Anī-ye Vasaţī) is a village in Ani Rural District, in the Central District of Germi County, Ardabil Province, Iran. At the 2006 census, its population was 696, in 114 families.

References 

Towns and villages in Germi County